Myra Reynolds (March 18, 1853August 20, 1936) was an American literary scholar.

Myra Reynolds was born on March 18, 1853, in Troupsburg, New York. She attended a normal school in Mansfield, Pennsylvania, from 1867 to 1870, after which she may have taught at the primary or secondary level. She entered Vassar College in 1876 and graduated with an AB in 1880. She then taught at Wells College as head of the English department; at the Free Academy in Corning, New York; and at Vassar.

In 1895, Reynolds received a PhD in English at the University of Chicago, where she was eventually appointed full professor in 1911. Early in her career, she specialized in the poetry of William Wordsworth. As of 1897, as an assistant professor, she taught a popular course called "Masterpieces in English Literature". As a literary scholar, Reynolds wrote on English poetry and edited selections from the work of Alfred, Lord Tennyson, and Robert Browning.

She retired in 1923, moving to near Pasadena, California. Reynolds died on August 20, 1936, in Los Angeles.

Publications

References 

1853 births
1936 deaths
19th-century American women writers
20th-century American women writers
Academics from New York (state)
American women academics
University of Chicago alumni
University of Chicago faculty
Vassar College alumni
Vassar College faculty
Wells College faculty